Burwell–Holland House is a historic plantation home located near Glade Hill, Franklin County, Virginia.  The original house dates back to 1798, and is a two-story, four-room Federal style brick dwelling. It measures 46 feet long and 21 feet wide with gable roof. A one-story, five-room frame, rear addition was added in 1976.  Also on the property are a contributing saddlenotched log blacksmith shop, saddlenotched log and chink smokehouse / storehouse, a cemetery, a 19th-century post and beam barn and a 19th-century wood frame corn crib built on short stone pillars.  It was the home of Congressman William A. Burwell (1780-1821), grandson of its builder Col. Lewis Burwell.

It was listed on the National Register of Historic Places in 2002.

References

Houses on the National Register of Historic Places in Virginia
Houses completed in 1798
Federal architecture in Virginia
Houses in Franklin County, Virginia
National Register of Historic Places in Franklin County, Virginia
Burwell family of Virginia